Roseibium suaedae is a Gram-negative and motile bacterium from the genus Roseibium, which has been isolated from the roots of the plant ,,Suaeda maritima,, from the Namhae Island in Korea.

References 

Rhodobacteraceae
Bacteria described in 2014